Pavlenko (Ukrainian, Russian: Павленко) is a patronymic surname of Ukrainian origin. The surname is a derivative of the given name Pavlo.

People with this surname:
 Aleksandr Pavlenko (disambiguation), multiple individuals
 Aleksey Pavlenko (skier) (born 1995), Russian skier
 Andrei Pavlenko (disambiguation), multiple individuals
 Aneta Pavlenko, American linguist
 Daria Pavlenko (born 1978), Russian ballet dancer
 Dmitry Pavlenko (born 1991), Russian handball player
 Ivan Omelianowicz-Pavlenko (1881–1962), Ukrainian military officer
 Kateryna Pavlenko (born 1988), Ukrainian singer
 Lyudmyla Pavlenko (born 1981), Ukrainian Paralympian
 Maxym Pavlenko (born 1975), Ukrainian footballer
 Mykhailo Omelianovych-Pavlenko (1878–1952), Ukrainian military leader
 Mykola Pavlenko (born 1979), Ukrainian footballer
 Oleksandr Pavlenko (1941–1995), Ukrainian footballer
 Oleksiy Pavlenko (born 1977), Ukrainian politician
 Pavel Pavlenko (1902–1993), Ukrainian actor
 Pyotr Pavlenko (1899–1951), Soviet writer
 Sergei Pavlenko (born 1953), Russian-British painter
 Vadim Pavlenko (1955–2000), Russian footballer
 Viktor Pavlenko (1886–1932), Ukrainian general
 Vladyslav Pavlenko (born 1994), Ukrainian footballer
 Yuliia Pavlenko (born 1991), Ukrainian Paralympian
 Yuriy Pavlenko (bоrn 1975), Ukrainian politician

See also
 

Ukrainian-language surnames
Surnames of Ukrainian origin
Patronymic surnames
Surnames from given names